Minuscule 213 (in the Gregory-Aland numbering), ε 129 (Soden), is a Greek minuscule manuscript of the New Testament, on parchment. Palaeographically it has been assigned to the 11th century. It has marginalia.

Description 

The codex contains almost complete text of the four Gospels, with only one lacunae, on 356 parchment leaves (size ); the leaves are arranged in octavo (8 leaves in quire). The text of John 19:6-21:25 was supplied in the 14th or 15th century.

The text is written in one column per page, 18 lines per page.

There is also a division according to the smaller Ammonian Sections (in Mark 234, 16:9), with references to the Eusebian Canons, but often irregular used.

It contains the Eusebian Canon tables at the beginning, lectionary markings at the margin for liturgical reading, a few  (lessons), pictures, and numbers of Verses at the end of each Gospel.

Text 

The Greek text of the codex Kurt Aland did not include its text to any Category.

According to the Claremont Profile Method it has mixed text in Luke 1, Luke 10, and Luke 20.

It lacks the text of the Pericope Adulterae (John 7:53-8:11).

History 

The manuscript was examined by Birch and Burgon. C. R. Gregory saw it in 1886.

It is currently housed at the Biblioteca Marciana (Gr. Z 542), at Venice.

See also 

 List of New Testament minuscules
 Biblical manuscript
 Textual criticism

References

Further reading 

 J. Neville Birdsall, The Missing Leaves of Codex 213 of the New Testament JTS IX (1958), pp. 78–81.

External links 

 R. Waltz, Minuscule 213 at the Encyclopedia of Textual Criticism

Greek New Testament minuscules
11th-century biblical manuscripts